The 2015 Daventry District Council election took place on 7 May 2015 to elect members of Daventry District Council in England. This was on the same day as other local elections.
Two seats changed hands with the Conservatives taking both from Labour leading to the council being made up as follows; 31 Conservative councillors, 2 Labour councillors, 2 UKIP councillors and 1 Liberal Democrat councillor.

Election result

Ward results

Abbey North

Abbey South

Barby & Kilsby

Brixworth

Drayton

Hill

Long Buckby

Moulton

Walgrave

Weedon

Welford

Woodford

References

2015 English local elections
2015
2010s in Northamptonshire